Tivadar Monostori (24 August 1936 – 18 March 2014) was a Hungarian football forward who played for Hungary in the 1958 and 1962 FIFA World Cups. He also played for Dorogi FC.

References

External links
 FIFA profile

1936 births
2014 deaths
Hungarian footballers
Hungary international footballers
Association football forwards
1958 FIFA World Cup players
1962 FIFA World Cup players
Hungarian football managers
Dorogi FC footballers
FC Tatabánya managers